Big Magic is an Indian free television channel owned by Zee Entertainment Enterprises. The channel was launched on 4 April 2011 as Big Magic by Reliance Broadcasting Network. In 2016, it was acquired by Zee.

History 

The channel was launched as Big Magic on 4 April 2011 by Reliance Broadcast Network, with the tagline "Har Pal Chatpata". Its programming consisted of sitcoms, mythology shows, animation series, weekend and festive specials events. It was acquired in November 2016 by Zee Entertainment Enterprises Limited.

Programming 

This is a list of programming currently and formerly broadcast by the channel.

References

External links

Hindi-language television channels in India
Television channels and stations established in 2011
2011 establishments in Uttar Pradesh
Zee Entertainment Enterprises
Comedy television channels in India
Hindi-language television stations